The 2013 McGrath Cup  was a Gaelic football competition played by the teams of Munster GAA. The competition differs from the Munster Senior Football Championship as it also features further education colleges and the winning team does not progress to another tournament at All-Ireland level. The competition was won by Kerry, defeating Tipperary in the final by seven points.

Teams
The following Third Level Colleges took part in 2013
 University College Cork (UCC)
 Tralee IT
 University of Limerick (UL)
 Cork Institute of Technology (CIT)
 Limerick Institute of Technology (LIT)

The following counties took part in 2013
Cork
Clare
Kerry
Limerick
Tipperary
Waterford

Match Results

Preliminary round
Kerry 4-22 IT Tralee 0-10 
Cork	1-15 Cork CIT 0-11 
Clare	1-20 Limerick IT 1-02

Quarter-finals

Limerick 2-10 Clare 2-10
Waterford 0-10 UL 0-10	
Cork 1-09 Tipperary 2-09
Kerry 2-12 UCC 0-10

Semi-finals
Kerry	3-17 Limerick 1-11
Tipperary 1-12 Waterford 2-08 (AET)

Final

References

External links
McGrath Cup at Munster GAA

McGrath Cup
McGrath Cup